Šilalė District Municipality (Samogitian: Šėlalės rajuona savivaldībė) is a municipality in Tauragė County, Lithuania.

Seniūnijos (Elderships or Wards) 
The Šilalė district municipality contains 14 seniūnijos (in English: elderships or wards); the main town or village is listed for each.

  – 
  – 
  – 
  – Kaltinėnai
  – Kvėdarna
  – Laukuva
  – Pajūris
  – 
  – Šilalė
  – Šilalė
  – Teneniai
  – Šilalė
  – Upyna
  –

Settlements 
The Šilalė district municipality contains:
 1 city (miestas) - Šilalė
 7 towns (miesteliai) - Kaltinėnai, Kvėdarna, Laukuva, Pajūris, Teneniai, Upyna, Žvingiai
 435 villages (kaimai)

The largest settlements, with population as of 2001:
 Šilalė – 6281
 Kvėdarna – 1934
 Laukuva – 998
 Pajūris – 872
 Kaltinėnai – 835
  – 633
  – 436
  – 410
 Upyna – 409
 Teneniai – 369

Population by locality

Status: M, MST - city, town / K, GST - village / VS - steading

References

 
Municipalities of Tauragė County
Municipalities of Lithuania